"Kiss It" is a song performed by American recording artist Dev with the collaboration of rapper Sage the Gemini, produced by Hit-Boy. It was written by Dev as single in anticipation of her EP Bittersweet July. The song was released on December 12, 2013, after posting a preview of the single on Facebook. "Kiss It" is a hip hop, swag song with synth influences that speaks about uncaring attitude.

Critical reception
The song received generally positive reviews from the critics. Billboard rated the song three stars and half out of five saying that "the singer indulges in sass and sarcasm on the track, which is highlighted by a buoyant verse from new labelmate Sage the Gemini, who sounds surprisingly comfortable assisting on a pop track". Idolator.com also praised the song saying that "the snappy hip-hop/pop tune appears basically a raised middle finger at her haters with a very catchy result, unluckily ruined by a maladjusted slow rap by featuring artist Sage the Gemini".

Music video
Music video for "Kiss It" was directed by Corey Nichols and released on VEVO on March 31, 2014. It shows Dev and Sage in a vintage villa with an inflatable pool and marble figurines. Dev sings the chorus while she's at the phone smoking and browsing magazines with disinterestedness. The video serves as the advertising campaign for the make-up chain of CK Colors lipsticks. Sage appears shirtless in the video, while he's cutting the garden grass with a mower. A "flip-book" lyric video with pop-art style was released on December 10, 2013 on the Dev's fansite YouTube channel. Both the music video and the lyric video passed together one million of views before the end of 2014.

Chart performance 
"Kiss It" debuted on Billboard Rhythmic Songs chart at number 38  on the issue dated April 26, 2014.

Charts

References

Songs about kissing
2013 songs
2013 singles
Dev (singer) songs
Song recordings produced by Hit-Boy
Songs written by Dev (singer)